Tommie Wright (March 21, 1919 – May 8, 2014) was an American pianist, composer and professor best known for composing the  Florida State Seminoles fight song.

Wright was a native of Indianapolis, Indiana and had a master's degree from Indiana University. He worked for as a pianist for NBC, providing background music for radio soap operas, TV shows and composing jingles for radio advertising. He served in the air force during World War II and wrote a musical for entertainment for the soldiers, entitled "Forward March." He has also written a plethora of musical compositions, ranging from songs, to ballets, to solo piano works.

He was hired to teach music as a professor at Florida State University from 1949 to 2008.

He taught there for years, teaching nearly 60,000 students. His music history course for non-majors was especially popular among students. He also started the Radio & Television department at Florida State. 
In August 2012, FSU presented Wright with an honorary doctorate.

Florida State Seminoles Fight Song 
Wright wrote the song with Doug Alley (a student at the school) in 1950. Doug Alley original wrote the song as a poem and Wright added music to it. He conducted the Marching Chiefs for the first time at a game in 2008

Personal life and death 
Wright was married for over 30 years to Rosalinda, head of the foreign languages department at Tallahassee Community College with whom he had 3 daughters. He had also three other daughters from previous marriages. Three of his children went on to pursue music in adulthood, one as a voice teacher, one as a pianist, and one as a broadway performer. He died in Tallahassee Memorial Hospital on May 8, 2014.

References

1919 births
2014 deaths
Musicians from Indianapolis
Indiana University alumni
Florida State University faculty